Lauren Ward (born June 19, 1970) is an American singer and actress. She has appeared in Broadway, Off-Broadway and West End musicals and plays. Ward originated the role of Miss Honey in the original Stratford-Upon-Avon, West End, and Broadway productions of the musical Matilda, and was nominated for the Tony Award for Best Featured Actress in a Musical for her performance.

Personal life
Ward was born in Lincoln, Nebraska and grew up in Kansas City, Missouri, the daughter of Denis Ward (1941–1986), a professor of geo-sciences at UMKC, and Holly Ward (née Harvick, 1941–2005). She graduated from Hickman Mills High School in 1988 and received her B.F.A from University of North Carolina School of the Arts. She is married to British stage director Matthew Warchus, with whom she has three children.

Career

Broadway
Ward made her Broadway debut in the 1994 revival of Carousel as Jenny Sanborn and Heavenly Friend. She appeared in the musical 1776 in 1997 as Martha Jefferson. She appeared in the 2001 revival of Follies as Young Sally, where she met her future husband, director Matthew Warchus.

In 2010, Ward originated the role of Miss Honey in the new musical Matilda, based on the book Matilda by Roald Dahl in the Royal Shakespeare Company's production at Stratford-upon-Avon. Ward then played this role in the West End starting in October 2011 and on Broadway in 2013. For this role, Ward was nominated for the 2013 Tony Award for Best Featured Actress in a Musical.

Off-Broadway theatre
In 1995 she played the dual roles of Jennie/Daisy in the musical Jack's Holiday. In 1997 Ward originated the role of Violet Karl in the musical Violet, for which she was nominated for a Drama Desk Award for Outstanding Actress in a Musical. In 1999 she played Arlene Murphy in the musical Exactly Like You. In 2000, Ward played the role of Helen in Stephen Sondheim's Saturday Night at the Second Stage Theatre. In 2001 she appeared in the Manhattan Theatre Club production of the musical Time and Again as Emily.

London
Ward has performed in several London venues: in the West End,  with the Royal Shakespeare Company and elsewhere. Some of these productions include: The Vagina Monologues (The Arts Theatre); Pericles, A Winters Tale (with the RSC); Batboy, Caroline or Change (Chichester, Hampstead Theatre, West End);The Sound of Music as the Baroness (London Palladium, 2006);The Philadelphia Story at The Old Vic as Elizabeth Imbrie (2005);A Midsummer Night's Dream, Camelot the Musical at Regents Park; and, with the Lost Musicals series, Du Barry Was a Lady (2001) and Johnny Johnson. and most recently Dear Evan Hansen at the Noel Coward Theatre since November 2019, for which she received an Olivier Nomination, and the West End revival of Heathers.

Film and television
Ward appeared in several episodes of the 2005 series Broken News. She has appeared in an episode of Torchwood and Law and Order SVU, The Last Days of Lehman Brothers (BBC), Touch of Frost (ITV),  Kiss Me First (Channel 4), She also appeared in Story of a Bad Boy (the debut film by Tom Donaghy and produced by Jean Doumanian), Series 7: The Contenders, the 1997 film In & Out as a student.

References

External links
 
 
 
 

1970 births
Living people
American stage actresses
Actors from Lincoln, Nebraska
Musicians from Lincoln, Nebraska
21st-century American women singers
21st-century American singers
Singers from Nebraska
Actresses from Nebraska
20th-century American women singers
20th-century American singers
20th-century American actresses
University of North Carolina School of the Arts alumni